Tristan and Iseult is a romantic narrative from medieval and modern literature. 

Tristan and Iseult or Tristan and Isolde, etc., may also refer to:

Tristan und Isolde, 19th century opera by Richard Wagner
Tristan et Iseult (album), a 1974 soundtrack by Christian Vander, retrospectively classified as the fourth album by French zeuhl band Magma.
Tristan & Isolde (film), a 2006 film
Tristan and Iseult (novel), by Rosemary Sutcliff, 1971
 The Tristan Quilt or Tristan and Isolde Quilt, late 13th century
Tristram and Iseult, a narrative poem by Matthew Arnold
Tristan and Isolde (Egusquiza), two paintings by Rogelio de Egusquiza

See also
Tristan (disambiguation)